Guns Babes Lemonade is the debut album by Australian electronica musician Muscles. It was released in Australia on 29 September 2007, 23 October 2007 in the US, and 28 April 2008 in the UK and Europe.

Track listing
 "Sweaty" – 4:16
 "Chocolate Raspberry Lemon & Lime" – 2:04
 "Ice Cream" – 3:28
 "Jerk" – 3:09
 "One Inch Badge Pin" – 4:15
 "My Friend Richard" – 3:51
 "The Lake" – 4:03
 "Lauren from Glebe" – 3:39
 "Marshmallow" – 4:26
 "Futurekidz" – 7:04
 "Hey Muscles I Love You" – 3:43

Charts

References

2007 debut albums
Modular Recordings albums
Muscles (musician) albums